Conus luteus, the mud cone, is a species of predatory sea snail, a marine gastropod mollusk in the family Conidae, the cone snails, cone shells or cones.

The subspecies Conus luteus richardsae Röckel & Korn, 1992 has been raised to species level as Conus richardsae Röckel & Korn, 1992

Description
The size of an adult shell varies between 18 mm and 54 mm. The color of the shell is yellow, pink or purplish, encircled by chestnut lines which are mostly broken up into chestnut and white articulations, an irregular white band below the middle. The aperture is purplish, with a central white band.

Distribution
This species occurs in the demersal zone of the Pacific Ocean from the Philippines to Northern Australia; off the Tuamotus.

References

  George Brettingham Sowerby, I, II & III: their conchological publications and molluscan taxa. Zootaxa. 2189: 1–218
 Filmer R.M. (2001). A Catalogue of Nomenclature and Taxonomy in the Living Conidae 1758 - 1998. Backhuys Publishers, Leiden. 388pp.
 Tucker J.K. & Tenorio M.J. (2009) Systematic classification of Recent and fossil conoidean gastropods. Hackenheim: Conchbooks. 296 pp.

External links
 Conus luteus - picture
 

luteus
Gastropods described in 1833
Taxa named by George Brettingham Sowerby I